Trigen can refer to:

 Trigeneration, a variant of cogeneration where the same fuel is used for power generation, heating and cooling
 Trigen Energy Corp., a U.S. district energy and CHP company operating as Veolia Energy North America since February 2011
 Trigens, creatures in the video game Far Cry